The Power Company is a team of superheroes-for-hire in the DC Comics universe. The team, created by Kurt Busiek and Tom Grummett, first appeared in JLA #61 (February 2002). They subsequently starred in an eponymous series that ran for eighteen issues, from April 2002 to September 2003, also written by Busiek.

Fictional team history
Josiah Power was one of America's best lawyers until his meta-gene was triggered during the alien Invasion by the activation of the Gene Bomb.

Following the untimely public activation of his metagene in the courtroom, attorney Josiah Power is dismissed from his law firm. Power had little interest in becoming a traditional costumed hero, but it became readily apparent that he could not continue to practice law without any undue public attention. He capitalizes on his professional experience to organize a for-hire team of heroes much along the lines of a law firm. Their very first mission as a team is against the East Asian criminal organization known as the Black Dragon Society. They successfully defuse a hostage situation initiated by the Society and returned to their base of operations.

The Power Company make a brief one panel appearance in a later Justice League of America story arc, "Syndicate Rules" in JLA #107-114 (2004-2005). The Crime Syndicate of America had attacked a S.T.A.R. Labs facility in San Francisco and the Power Company is shown and described to have been defeated.

Action Comics
Skyrocket is seen much later, in Action Comics #832-833 as one of the dozens of superpowered beings. She is part of a small grouping of escaped beings who save the rest and the world from the attentions of marauding aliens. A communications error beams the adventures of Skyrocket and her allies to every single TV on earth.

Teen Titans
Sapphire was abducted and became a combatant in Dark Side Club. After being rescued by Miss Martian and brought to Titans Tower with the other survivors, she leaves, preferring to stay loyal to the "forgotten, but not gone" Power Company.

Justice League of America
Recently, the team appeared in the pages of James Robinson's Justice League of America title. They were hired to defend a S.T.A.R. Labs facility, only to be brutally defeated by Doctor Impossible and his new gang of villains. In a conversation at the JLA Watchtower, the Guardian mentions that all of the Power Company members are currently hospitalized, and that Josiah would've died had Mon-El not forced open his rib cage in order to help treat his heart.

Power Surge
Power Surge was a DC Comics event in 2002 intended to promote the start of The Power Company, a new comic book series by writer Kurt Busiek, who also wrote all seven issues of Power Surge. Power Surge was composed of seven eponymous one-shot issues (although each story had its own title), each highlighting one of the seven primary members of the Power Company. Each story prominently featured the involvement of a classic, already-famous comic book character (with the 'classic' character looming much larger on the cover than the book's nominal main character).

Since each issue was essentially an origin story told in the past tense, writer Kurt Busiek could indulge in a playfully retro style reminiscent of DC Comics' 1980s output, and even incorporate characters who were not available under other circumstances, such as the Barry Allen Flash and the Hal Jordan Green Lantern, both of whom were "dead" in regular DC Comics continuity.

The comics featured were:
 Bork, "Vulnerability", featuring Batman and The Flash, art by Kieron Dwyer
 Josiah Power, "Career Opportunities", featuring Superman, art by Keith Giffen
 Manhunter, "A Well-Respected Man...", featuring Nightwing, art by Dan Jurgens
 Sapphire, "Hatch of the Serpent's Egg", featuring the Justice League, art by Mark Bagley
 Skyrocket, "First Gleamings", featuring Green Lantern, art by Joe Staton
 Striker Z, "Hk Jiangtou", featuring Superboy, art by Ramon F. Bachs
 Witchfire, "I Want to See the Bright Lights Tonight", featuring Wonder Woman, art by Matt Haley

Members
The Power Company had several superpowered partners and associates, as well a support staff dedicated to day to day corporate operations. These included:

Partners
 Josiah Power - Managing partner, Josiah is most likely the most powerful member of Power Company, but rarely accompanies the team in the field. The exact nature of his abilities have never been fully explored. Superman said he is one of the most powerful metas he's ever met. Josiah lives with his partner Rupe outside of San Francisco.
 Manhunter (Kirk DePaul) - Partner. A mercenary clone of Manhunter Paul Kirk. He was slain by Mark Shaw.
 Skyrocket (Celia Forrestal) - Partner. Skyrocket, a former Navy officer who inherited the energy manipulating Argo Harness from her murdered parents, she used the Argo Harness to become a respected hero, and was later recruited to enhance the credibility to the Power Company.
 Witchfire (Rebecca Carstairs) - Partner. A magic user, and popular entertainer star of film and pop music videos, she was actually revealed to be a plant based homunculus.

Associates
 Bork (Carl Andrew Bork) - Associate. A reformed villain, he is the team's gentle giant.
 Firestorm (Ronald Raymond) - Associate. The Nuclear Man briefly joined the power company, but left before the end of the series.
 Sapphire (Candace Jean Gennaro) - Associate. She is an underaged runaway powered by a psycho-reactive alien gem called the Serpent's Egg which appears to tap her latent telekinetic abilities.
 Striker Z (Daniel Tsang) - Associate. A former Hong Kong stuntman who, due to an accident with experimental fuel, became a human battery and is a superstrong martial artist.

Support crew
 Charlie Lau - Former employee of S.T.A.R. Labs Hong Kong, Charlie now serves as the group's resident technical support specialist.
 Raul - Pilot of the Company Car, the firm's multimillion-dollar airship.
 Silver Shannon - Josiah's personal assistant, former lead singer of the Maniaks.
 Garrison Slate - Interim Administrator and CEO of S.T.A.R. Labs San Francisco.

Other corporate teams
Other corporate superhero teams have been active in the DC Comics universe. The best known are the Conglomerate, the Blood Pack, Hero Hotline, S.T.A.R. Corps and the Captains of Industry.

References

External links
 Cosmic Teams: Power Company Chronology
 DCU Guide: Power Company
 DCU Guide: Silver Shannon

2002 comics debuts
DC Comics titles
DC Comics superhero teams
Characters created by Kurt Busiek
Comics by Kurt Busiek